Johannes Roberts (born 24 May 1976) is a British film director, screenwriter and producer. He directed the film 47 Meters Down and its sequel, as well as The Other Side of the Door, The Strangers: Prey at Night and Resident Evil: Welcome to Raccoon City. His films have grossed nearly $200 million worldwide at the box office.

Career

After starting his career making a series of micro budget horror movies for the DVD market including Forest of the Damned starring Tom Savini and the world's first series made for cell phones When Evil Calls Roberts wrote and directed the thriller F – a story of a group of teachers under attack by a group of pupils in a college after hours. Made for only £100k the film was picked up by Studio Canal and released theatrically in the UK where it was released to critical acclaim.

Roberts then directed Stephen Rea in the television film Roadkill for NBC before helming the science fiction thriller Storage 24 for Universal Pictures. Written by and starring Noel Clarke.

In 2016 Roberts wrote and directed the ghost story The Other Side of the Door for 20th Century Fox and Fox International. The movie was produced by Alexandre Aja. Filmed entirely in Mumbai and starring Sarah Wayne Callies, Jeremy Sisto, Sofia Rosinsky, and Javier Botet. The film was a success financially grossing over $14 million.

In 2017 Roberts wrote and directed the shark thriller 47 Meters Down, starring Mandy Moore and Matthew Modine. The boundary breaking movie was almost entirely shot underwater. Originally set to be released by the Weinstien Company and Dimension the movie was famously released by mistake into stores on DVD under the title In the Deep. It was pirated worldwide before being picked up by Entertainment Studios and released in cinemas with little hope of success - only to become a sleeper hit, debuting #5 in the US box office before rising to #4 the following week. It would become the highest grossing independent movie of the year, making $62 million from its sub $5 million budget.

Roberts directed the sequel to the horror film The Strangers (2008), entitled The Strangers: Prey at Night and released in 2018, and starring Christina Hendricks, Martin Henderson, Bailee Madison and Lewis Pullman. The film entered the US box office at #3 behind Black Panther and A Wrinkle in Time.

In 2019, Roberts helmed a sequel to his 2017 film, 47 Meters Down, titled 47 Meters Down: Uncaged which grossed over $46 million and took the 47 franchise to over $100 million.

In 2021, Roberts wrote and directed Resident Evil: Welcome to Raccoon City, a reboot of the Resident Evil film franchise. The film became the fourth top ten hit at the US box office for Roberts in four consecutive years, the film was a modest box office success, which grossed $42 million, topped digital rental charts in its first three weekends of release.

In 2022, Roberts wrote and directed 'Suicide Bid', a segment included in the horror anthology film V/H/S/99 which premiered at 2022 Toronto International Film Festival. The film became massive success, it's the most watched movie debut of Shudder and his segment was critical acclaim. Roberts are teaming with Japanese producer and music industry executive Yasushi Akimoto in Supernatural horror film "The Not Polly" Roberts will direct the mysterious film for Screen Gems, with James Wan, "Border Patrol"

in 2023, Roberts wrote and directed "The Red Triangle" Roberts will direct from his script, with Tea Shop Productions’ James Harris and Mark Lane producing. Executive producers are Byron Allen, Carolyn Folks, Jennifer Lucas, Chris Charalambous, and Matthew Signer.

Filmography
Film

Television

References

External links

 

Living people
1976 births
British film directors
British male screenwriters
British film producers
Horror film directors
People from Cambridge